Palakariya Cove is a 3.2 km wide cove indenting for 2 km the northwest coast of Liège Island in the Palmer Archipelago, Antarctica.  Entered south of Bebresh Point.

The cove is named after Palakariya River in western Bulgaria.

Location
British mapping in 1978.

Maps
 British Antarctic Territory.  Scale 1:200000 topographic map No. 3197. DOS 610 - W 63 60.  Tolworth, UK, 1978.
 British Antarctic Territory.  Scale 1:200000 topographic map No. 3198. DOS 610 - W 64 60.  Tolworth, UK, 1978.
 Antarctic Digital Database (ADD). Scale 1:250000 topographic map of Antarctica. Scientific Committee on Antarctic Research (SCAR). Since 1993, regularly upgraded and updated.

References
 Palakariya Cove. SCAR Composite Gazetteer of Antarctica.
 Bulgarian Antarctic Gazetteer. Antarctic Place-names Commission. (details in Bulgarian, basic data in English)

External links
 Palakariya Cove. Adjusted Copernix satellite image

Coves of Graham Land
Landforms of the Palmer Archipelago
Bulgaria and the Antarctic
Liège Island